Cervulus or Cervula is the name of a Roman festival celebrated on the kalends of January (1 January). According to Chambers (1864), remnants seem to have been incorporated into a medieval Christian Feast of the Ass, (Festum Asinorum), which honors the role of donkeys in the Bible, including the Flight into Egypt.

References

Ancient Roman festivals
January observances
New Year celebrations